The Seetha Amman Temple is a Hindu temple located approximately  from Hakgala Botanical Garden and  from Nuwara Eliya. The temple is located in the village of Seetha Eliya (also known as Sita Eliya). This place is believed to be the site where Sita was held captive by the rakshasa king Ravana, and where she prayed daily for her husband Rama to come and rescue her in the Hindu epic, the Ramayana. On the rock face across the stream are circular depressions that are regarded to be the footprints of Hanuman.

References

Hindu temples in Nuwara Eliya District
Shakti temples